Edward Coke Mann (November 21, 1880 – November 11, 1931) was a U.S. Representative from South Carolina.

Born in Lowndesville, South Carolina, Mann attended the common schools and was graduated from The Citadel, Charleston, South Carolina, in 1901.

He taught school one year and was connected with a tobacco company for four years. He graduated from the law department of the University of South Carolina at Columbia in 1906, where he was a member of the Euphradian Society, and commenced practice in St. Matthews, Calhoun County, South Carolina.  He served as solicitor of the first circuit of South Carolina 1916-1919.

Mann was elected as a Democrat to the 66th Congress to fill the vacancy caused by the resignation of Asbury Francis Lever and served from October 7, 1919, to March 3, 1921. He unsuccessfully tried to gain renomination in 1920.

He practiced law in Orangeburg, South Carolina. He was appointed master in equity for Orangeburg County in November 1923. He was reappointed in November 1927 and served until his death.
He was accidentally killed while on a hunting trip. He was interred in Sunnyside Cemetery, Orangeburg, South Carolina.

References

Sources

1880 births
1931 deaths
Accidental deaths in South Carolina
The Citadel, The Military College of South Carolina alumni
University of South Carolina alumni
Democratic Party members of the United States House of Representatives from South Carolina
Hunting accident deaths
20th-century American politicians